Sergeant John E. Buffington (July 12, 1839 – April 26, 1915) was an American soldier who fought in the American Civil War. Buffington received the country's highest award for bravery during combat, the Medal of Honor, for his action  during the Third Battle of Petersburg in Virginia on 2 April 1865. He was honored with the award on 3 April 1908.

Biography
Born in Carroll County, Maryland, Buffington enlisted in the 6th Maryland Infantry Regiment. He is noted as the first Union soldier to raise a flag within the Confederates lines for the Third Division of the VI Corps of the Union Army at the Third Battle of Petersburg. This act, which he performed on 2 April 1865, earned him the medal of honor. However, Buffington was not presented with the medal until 1908 as he had mustered out of the army without applying for it.

Medal of Honor citation

See also

List of American Civil War Medal of Honor recipients: A–F

References

1841 births
1924 deaths
People of Maryland in the American Civil War
Union Army officers
United States Army Medal of Honor recipients
American Civil War recipients of the Medal of Honor
Union Army soldiers